SWITCH was a Mexican music magazine published by Editorial Premiere.

It was the only Mexican music magazine to be awarded at an international level by the Society of Publication Designers (SPD).

History 
The magazine was founded in the 1990s by Benjamín Salcedo, Xavier Velasco, and Fernando Rivera Calderón. The magazine primarily focused on rock music in its beginning, but the magazine shifted focus to include additional genres at different stages of its operations.

References

External links
 Official website

Defunct magazines published in Mexico
Magazines with year of establishment missing
Magazines with year of disestablishment missing
Magazines published in Mexico
Monthly magazines published in Mexico
Music magazines
Spanish-language magazines